Rajnagar (Vidhan Sabha constituency) was one of the 68 constituencies in the Himachal Pradesh Legislative Assembly of Himachal Pradesh a northern state of India. Rajnagar was also part of Kangra Lok Sabha constituency. It was made defunct by the Delimitation of Parliamentary and Assembly Constituencies Order, 2008.

Members of the Legislative Assembly

Election results

2007

See also
List of constituencies of the Himachal Pradesh Legislative Assembly
Chamba district

References

Former assembly constituencies of Himachal Pradesh
Chamba district